Yerköprü Waterfall is a waterfall  in Konya Province, central Turkey.

It is formed at a place, where the river was blocked by earth from the slopes of the river valley due to landslide. Spring water named Karasu, which outcropped from the valley slope, overspread on the landslide earth mass and formed a layer of travertine. Karasu spring water joins Göksu River here. The cave contains stalactites and stalagmites inside.

The cave and the waterfall are named after the place "Yerköprü", which means literally "ground bridge".

It is a popular tourist attraction. The site has paved walkways, shelters with outdoor furniture for picnic and a car parking lot. The waterfall can be best observed in a bird's eye view from the nearby Çakallar village, which is situated at an elevation of ,.

References

Waterfalls of Turkey
Landforms of Konya Province
Hadim District
Tourist attractions in Konya Province